State Street is a large south-north street, also one of the main streets, in Chicago, Illinois, USA and its south suburbs. Its intersection with Madison Street has marked the base point for Chicago's address system since 1909. State begins in the north at North Avenue, the south end of Lincoln Park, runs south through the heart of the Chicago Loop, and ends at the southern city limits, intersecting 127th Street along the bank of the Little Calumet River. It resumes north of 137th Street in Riverdale and runs south intermittently through Chicago's south suburbs until terminating at New Monee Road in Crete, Illinois.

From north to south, State Street traverses the following community areas of Chicago: Near North Side to the Chicago River, Chicago Loop to Roosevelt Road, Near South Side to 26th Street, Douglas to 39th Street, Grand Boulevard to 51st Street, Washington Park to 63rd Street, Grand Crossing to 79th Street, Chatham to 91st Street, Roseland to 115th Street, and West Pullman to 127th Street, where it terminates across from Riverdale Bend Woods.  The street runs parallel and adjacent to the Dan Ryan Expressway from 65th Street south to just beyond 95th Street, where State Street crosses the I-94 Bishop Ford Memorial Freeway to enter Roseland.

History

The northern portion of the Vincennes Trace or Vincennes Trail, a buffalo migration route and an Indian trail which ran some 250 miles to Vincennes, Indiana, was called Hubbard's Trace or Hubbard's Trail since it connected Chicago with Gurdon Saltonstall Hubbard's more southerly trading outposts. It took on the name State Road after some state-funded improvements. Vincennes Avenue, one of Chicago's rare diagonal streets, is a vestige of the Vincennes Trace, and further south the trail eventually became Illinois Route 1. In its early days, State Road was unpaved and known for having mud so deep it was jokingly said that it could suck down a horse and buggy.  In the late 1860s, Potter Palmer embarked on efforts to raise the profile and prestige of State Street. He enticed Marshall Field and Levi Leiter to move their prosperous and growing department store, Field, Leiter & Co., to the corner of State and Washington Streets in 1868, and he built his own Palmer House hotel nearby in 1870. For many years the city's most well-known seafood retailer, Burhop's Seafood, was located on North State Street, as well as the historic Chicago Theatre. The latter was lit by Commercial Light Company in 1958, making it the brightest thoroughfare in the world, according to the Chicago Tribune.

State Street shopping

State Street became a shopping destination during the 1900s and is referred to in the song "Chicago," which mentions "State Street, that great street."  In 1979, the downtown portion was converted into a pedestrian mall with only bus traffic allowed.  Mayor Richard M. Daley oversaw the State Street Revitalization Project and on November 15, 1996, the street was reopened to traffic.

During the second half of the 20th century, State Street was eclipsed by Michigan Avenue's Magnificent Mile as a shopping district. Various projects to restore State Street's shopping attraction have been met with some success, and the State Street corridor is gaining residential as well as more traditional commercial development. Anchored by Macy's Chicago, the flagship location is the world's second largest department store by square footage. The 12-story building features many historical landmarks including a Tiffany & Co. Dome.

The Block 37 opened in 2009 at State and Washington, bringing with it a large group of upscale retailers to North State Street including Anthropologie, L'Occitane en Provence, Banana Republic, Zara, Disney Store, Godiva, Sephora, and an AMC Theatres location on the fourth floor. On the Pedway level is the Blue Line Washington station and Red Line Lake station both connected underground.

The department store chain Carson Pirie Scott closed their flagship store on State Street on February 21, 2007 after over 100 years of business in that location. Target opened their 125,000 square feet State Street store in the landmark Carson Pirie Scott building later in 2012.

On January 12, 2012, Walgreens's opened its U.S. flagship location at Randolph Street, where it had previously existed from 1926 to 2005, when construction of Joffrey Tower necessitated its demolition. The renowned Chicago-based Joffrey Ballet is housed on the upper floors of the tower.

In October 2015, Michael Jordan opened his first store at 32 South State St. and is branded as 32 South State. The flagship store included retail shopping, Chicago Bulls memorabilia, a training lab for local youth, and a basketball court on the upper levels.

In July 2019, Primark announced its U.S. market expansion to Chicago with a three-level 45,000 square foot flagship location on State Street where Gap formerly housed its flagship store. The location is scheduled to open in 2020 and will be its first store in the Midwest.

In November 2019 Uniqlo opened its second Chicago location on North State Street replacing the two-level H&M at 22 N. State.

Landmarks

Downtown

State Street is the location of many landmarks in downtown Chicago:
Chicago Archbishop's Mansion
The Original Playboy Mansion
Fisher Studio Houses
Holy Name Cathedral
Tree Studio Building and Annexes
Marina City
ABC7 News Studio
Page Brothers Building
Chicago Theatre
Marshall Field and Company Building
Block 37
Reliance Building
Carson, Pirie, Scott and Company Building
 A.M. Rothschild & Company Store (DePaul Center)
Harold Washington Library
Second Leiter Building
 University Center
 Mentor Building
 Palmer House

South Side

Landmarks on State Street in Chicago's South Side, south of Roosevelt Road, include:

Black Metropolis-Bronzeville District
Chicago Bee Building
Overton Hygienic Building
Illinois Institute of Technology Academic Campus
McCormick Tribune Campus Center
S.R. Crown Hall
Shimer College
State Street Village
 Roberts Temple Church of God in Christ Building
 Harold L. Ickes Homes
 Dearborn Homes
South Park Manor Historic District

Memorial
The bridge where State Street crosses the Chicago River is named the Bataan-Corregidor Memorial Bridge in honor of the World War II defenders of Bataan and Corregidor including those in the Bataan Death March.

References
 

 Chicago Public Library

Shopping districts and streets in the United States
Streets in Chicago
Shopping malls in Chicago
Articles containing video clips